Harry van der Kamp (born 1947 in Kampen) is a Dutch bass singer in opera and concert. Mostly active in Historically informed performance, he founded the Gesualdo Ensemble. He is also an academic voice teacher.

Singing career 
Born in Kampen, van der Kamp studied first law and psychology in Amsterdam. Then he studied singing with Elizabeth Cooymans and Max van Egmond at the Amsterdam Sweelinck Conservatory.

He has worked mainly in Early music and Baroque, including Baroque opera of composers such as Francesco Cavalli, Stefano Landi, Antonio Cesti, Henry Purcell, Jean-Philippe Rameau, Reinhard Keiser and George Frideric Handel. He sang with the Nederlandse Opera in Monteverdi's operas L'Orfeo and L'incoronazione di Poppea, and also in Rêves d'un Marco Polo of Claude Vivier. Bernard Holland described his appearance in 1996 as Zoroastro in Handel's Orlando with Les Arts Florissants, conducted by William Christie, in the New York Times: "Harry van der Kamp is the only man, managing Zoroastro's bass arias with pleasing clarity and heft."

He recorded several Bach cantatas and the Mass in B minor with Gustav Leonhardt. On a recording of Bach's St John Passion with Sigiswald Kuijken he appeared together with his teacher Max van Egmond and Christoph Prégardien as the Evangelist. In 1996 he recorded Bach's St Matthew Passion with Frans Brüggen and the Orchestra of the Eighteenth Century in a live performance in the Vredenburg (castle), together with Nico van der Meel (Evangelist), Kristinn Sigmundsson (Jesus), María Cristina Kiehr, Ian Bostridge and Peter Kooy, among others. He performed regularly with the choir Junge Kantorei in Eberbach Abbey, in Monteverdi's Vespro della Beata Vergine in 1978, in Handel's Messiah in 1979, in Bach's St. Matthew Passion in 1981 and 1985, and in his Mass in B minor in 1983.

He has worked with such ensembles as the Hilliard Ensemble, Musica Antiqua Köln or Les Arts Florissants. With the Huelgas Ensemble he recorded works of Matteo da Perugia.

In 1984 he founded the Gesualdo Consort Amsterdam to perform madrigals of the 16th and 17th century, of composers such as Carlo Gesualdo, Emilio de' Cavalieri and Scipione Lacorcia, and also music of the 20th century.

Van der Kamp and the Gesualdo Consort completed Het Sweelinck Monument, a first complete recording of the vocal works of Jan Pieterszoon Sweelinck on 17CDs in October 2010. The recording was awarded the "Klassieke Muziekprijs 2010". Queen Beatrix of the Netherlands was present at the commemorative event at the Oude Kerk van Amsterdam on 20 October 2010, and Van der Kamp was made a Ridder in de Orde van de Nederlandse Leeuw.

Teaching career
In 1994 Harry van der Kamp was appointed professor at the Hochschule für Künste Bremen. He has been teaching at the Stiftung Kloster Michaelstein.

References

External links 
 Harry van der Kamp on Haydn Festival Eisenstadt
 

1947 births
Living people
Dutch basses
Operatic basses
Dutch academics
20th-century Dutch male opera singers
People from Kampen, Overijssel
Conservatorium van Amsterdam alumni
Knights of the Order of the Netherlands Lion
Academic staff of the University of the Arts Bremen